SQL:2011 or ISO/IEC 9075:2011 (under the general title "Information technology – Database languages – SQL") is the seventh revision of the ISO (1987) and ANSI (1986) standard for the SQL database query language.  It was formally adopted in December 2011. The standard consists of 9 parts which are described in detail in SQL.
The next version is SQL:2016.

New features
One of the main new features is improved support for temporal databases. Language enhancements for temporal data definition and manipulation include:

 Time Period definitions use two standard table columns as the start and end of a named time period, with closed-open semantics.  This provides compatibility with existing data models, application code, and tools
 Definition of application time period tables (elsewhere called valid time tables), using the  annotation 
 Update and deletion of application time rows with automatic time period splitting
 Temporal primary keys incorporating application time periods with optional non-overlapping constraints via the  clause
 Temporal referential integrity constraints for application time tables
 Definition of system-versioned tables (elsewhere called transaction time tables), using the  annotation and  modifier.  System time periods are maintained automatically. Constraints for system-versioned tables are not required to be temporal and are only enforced on current rows
 Application time and system versioning can be used together to provide bitemporal tables

Support in DBMS

SAP HANA 2.0 SP03 supports system-versioned tables using the standard select syntax  SAP HANA 2.0 SP04 adds (partial) support for application-time versioning 

IBM DB2 version 10 claims to be the first database to have a conforming implementation of this feature in what they call "Time Travel Queries", although they use the alternative syntax .

Oracle Oracle 12c supports temporal functionality in compliance with SQL:2011.  Versions 10g and 11g implement the time-sliced queries in what they call Flashback Queries, using the alternative syntax . Notably both of Oracle's implementations depend on the database transaction log and so only allow temporal queries against recent changes which are still being retained for backup.

MariaDB 10.3 implements system-versioned tables. MariaDB 10.4.3 added support for application-versioned tables.

PostgreSQL requires installation of the temporal_tables extension. Temporal Tables Extension supports the system-period temporal tables only, but does not follow the SQL:2011 design. 

Ebean ORM supports History AS OF and VERSIONS BETWEEN queries on PostgreSQL and MySQL using triggers, history tables and views.

CockroachDB has supported  queries since at least v1.0.7.

See also
 SQL
 Wikibook SQL
 Slowly changing dimension
 Temporal database

References

External links
 .
 .
 .
 .
 .

 
Declarative programming languages
Query languages
Programming languages created in 2011